The sharpfin barracuda  (Sphyraena acutipinnis) is a schooling species of barracuda that inhabits lagoons, bays and seaward reefs. It is nocturnally active. It grows to  total length, although it is commonly somewhat smaller. The species is found across the Indo-Pacific from East Africa to the Hawaiian, Marquesan and Tuamoto islands, north to southern Japan.

References

External links
 Sharpfin Barracuda @ Fishes of Australia

sharpfin barracuda
Fish of the Indian Ocean
Fish of the Pacific Ocean
Marine fish of Australia
sharpfin barracuda
Taxa named by Francis Day